David Magarshack (23 December 1899 – 26 October 1977) was a British translator and biographer of Russian authors, best remembered for his translations of Dostoevsky and Nikolai Gogol.

Biography
Magarshack was born in Riga, in present-day Latvia, at the time part of the Russian Empire. In 1920, he moved to the United Kingdom in order to study.

After graduating from University College London with a degree in English Language and Literature in 1924, Magarshack attempted to make a career out of journalism, and then out of writing crime fiction, neither of which were successful. He gained British citizenship by naturalisation in 1931.

In early 1949, Magarshack was approached by E.V. Rieu, the editor of the Penguin Classics series, in order to translate Dostoevsky's Crime and Punishment. Magarshack accepted the job for an advance of £200 and royalties of seven-and-a-half percent. Over the next 13 years, Magarshack went on to become one of the most prolific contributors to the Classics series. His last translation for the series, Chekhov's Lady with Lapdog and Other Stories, was published in 1964, after which Magarshack ceased translation for the series due to the new series editor's preference for more scholarly translations.

Magarshack's translation work was assisted by his wife Elsie, a Yorkshire-born, Cambridge-graduate of English. Magarshack's daughter, Stella, has stated that Elsie helped Magarshack with all his translations and proofreading work.

Magarshack wrote a series of biographies of Russian writers. His biography of Dostoyevsky was savagely critiqued by Joseph Frank who wrote: "It is difficult to give any connected account of Mr. Magarshack’s interpretation of Dostoevsky because, to tell the truth, no such interpretation exists".

Magarshack continued to translate both contemporary and classic Russian literature. In addition, Magarshack wrote extensively on translation theory, though most of this work would remain unpublished. Magarshack died in London in 1977.

Legacy
Collections of Magarshack's writings, as well as his personal and professional correspondences, are held at the Leeds Russian Archive at the University of Leeds, as well as the Penguin archive at the University of Bristol.

The novelist Anthony Powell paid the tribute: "David Magarshack has revolutionized the reading of Dostoyevsky’s novels in English by his translations which have appeared during the last few years … for years I was rather an anti-Dostoyevsky man, owing to the badness of the translations, but now there is an excellent translator in Magarshack". (Punch, 2 April 1958)’.

The Nobel laureate Kazuo Ishiguro has identified Magarshack's translations as a significant influence on his writing style. In a 2005 interview with the British Council in Poland, Ishiguro stated:

Selected works
A more complete list of Magarshack's work can be found in Appendix 2 of McAteer (2017).

Translations
 Crime and Punishment, Fyodor Dostoevsky (1951).
 The Seagull, Anton Chekhov (1952).
 The Devils, Dostoevsky (1953, see Demons).
 Oblomov, Ivan Goncharov (1954).
 The Idiot, Dostoevsky (1955).
 The Brothers Karamazov, Dostoevsky (1958).
 Dead Souls, Nikolai Gogol (1961).
 Anna Karenina, Leo Tolstoy (1961).

Biographies
 Stanislavskii, a Life (1950).
 Chekhov, a Life (1952).
 Turgenev, a Life (1954).
 Chekhov, The Dramatist (1955).
 Gogol, a Life (1957).
 Dostoyevsky (1962).
 Pushkin: a Biography (1967).

Fiction
 Big Ben Strikes Eleven, A Murder Story for Grown-Up People (1934).
 Death Cuts a Caper (1935).
 Three Dead (1936).

Notes

Bibliography

External links
 The Magarshack Collection at the Leeds Russian Archive.

1899 births
1977 deaths
20th-century biographers
20th-century British novelists
Alumni of University College London
British biographers
British male novelists
British people of Latvian-Jewish descent
Latvian emigrants to the United Kingdom
Latvian Jews
Writers from Riga
People from the Governorate of Livonia
Russian–English translators
Translators of Fyodor Dostoyevsky
20th-century British translators
Male biographers